Ryssel may refer to:
Carl Victor Ryssel, German theologian (1849-1905)
Rijsel, the Dutch name for the French city of Lille, also Rysel in West Flemish.